Middletown is a city located in Butler and Warren counties in the southwestern part of the U.S. state of Ohio, about 35 miles (47 km) north of Cincinnati. The population as of the 2020 census was 50,987. It is part of the Cincinnati metropolitan area.

Formerly in Lemon, Turtlecreek, and Franklin townships, Middletown was incorporated by the Ohio General Assembly on February 11, 1833, and became a city in 1886. The city was the home of AK Steel Holding Corporation (formerly Armco), a major steel works founded in 1900. Although offices were moved to nearby West Chester Township in 2007, the AK Steel factory is still in Middletown. Middletown is also home to Hook Field Municipal Airport (airport code MWO), which was formerly served by commercial airlines but is currently only for general aviation. A regional campus of Miami University is located in Middletown. In 1957, Middletown was designated as an All-America City.

Name
The city's name is believed to have been given by its founder, Stephen Vail, but questions remain unanswered as to why. One local historian stated that the city received its name because Vail had come from Middletown, New Jersey. Another writer believed that the city was named Middletown because it was the midway point of navigation on the Great Miami River, which was then considered a navigable stream. Another theory is credited to the city being roughly halfway between Dayton and Cincinnati. Vail centered the city in Fractional Section 28 of Town 2, Range 4 North. One of the first settlers in Middletown was Daniel Doty, who migrated there from New Jersey in the late 18th century.

Geography
Middletown is located at 39°30′N 84°23′W (39.5060, -84.3759).

Middletown adjoins the Great Miami River. Middletown also borders the cities of Franklin, Monroe, Trenton, and Liberty and Madison Townships.

Demographics

2020 census
As of the census of 2020, there were 50,987 people in 20,057 households in the city. The racial makeup of the city was 81.3% White, 11.2% African American, 0.0% Native American, 0.7% Asian, 0.1 % Native Hawaiian and other Pacific Islander and 5.3% from two or more races. Hispanic or Latino of any race were 4.1% of the population.

There were 20,057 households with an average 2.39 people living in each, 81% of whom had lived in the same house for at least 1 year. 85% of residents were high school graduates, and 15.6% had received Bachelor's degrees or higher. 6.2% of residents were under the age of 6, 22.5% of residents were under the age of 18, and 17.2% were over the age of 65. The gender makeup of the city was 52.3% female and 47.7% male. The percentage of persons under 65 with a disability was 16.8%.  

The median household income was $42,290, and the annual per capita income average was $24,184. Approximately 22.5% of persons were below the poverty line. The average travel time to work was 23.1 minutes. 59.2% of residents worked in the civilian labor force, 54.5% of whom were female.

2010 census
As of the census of 2010, there were 48,694 people, 20,238 households, and 12,505 families living in the city. The racial makeup of the city was 83.3% White, 11.7% African American, 0.2% Native American, 0.5% Asian, 1.6% from other races, and 2.7% from two or more races. Hispanic or Latino of any race were 3.8% of the population.

There were 20,238 households, of which 31.0% had children under the age of 18 living with them, 37.9% were married couples living together, 18.1% had a female householder with no husband present, 5.8% had a male householder with no wife present, and 38.2% were non-families. 31.5% of all households were made up of individuals, and 11.9% had someone living alone who was 65 years of age or older. The average household size was 2.38 and the average family size was 2.97.

The median age in the city was 38.3 years. 24.3% of residents were under the age of 18; 9% were between the ages of 18 and 24; 24.7% were from 25 to 44; 27.1% were from 45 to 64; and 14.9% were 65 years of age or older. The gender makeup of the city was 47.5% male and 52.5% female.

2000 census
As of the census of 2000, there were 51,605 people, 21,469 households, and 13,933 families living in the city. The population density was 2,011.4 people per square mile (776.5/km2). There were 23,144 housing units at an average density of 902.1 per square mile (348.2/km2). The racial makeup of the city was 86.98% White, 10.59% African American, 0.25% Native American, 0.37% Asian, 0.03% Pacific Islander, 0.36% from other races, and 1.42% from two or more races. Hispanic or Latino of any race were 0.89% of the population.

There were 21,469 households, out of which 29.9% had children under the age of 18 living with them, 45.9% were married couples living together, 14.6% had a female householder with no husband present, and 35.1% were non-families. 29.6% of all households were made up of individuals, and 11.4% had someone living alone who was 65 years of age or older. The average household size was 2.38 and the average family size was 2.94.

In the city, the population was spread out, with 25.0% under the age of 18, 9.3% from 18 to 24, 29.2% from 25 to 44, 21.6% from 45 to 64, and 14.9% who were 65 years of age or older. The median age was 36 years. For every 100 females, there were 91.4 males. For every 100 females age 18 and over, there were 87.3 males.

The median income for a household in the city was $36,215, and the median income for a family was $43,867. Males had a median income of $35,705 versus $23,865 for females. The per capita income for the city was $19,773. About 9.2% of families and 12.6% of the population were below the poverty line, including 18.4% of those under age 18 and 9.4% of those age 65 or over.

Transportation
Ohio State Route 4 runs north-south through Middletown. Ohio State Route 73 and Ohio State Route 122 run east-west through the city. Ohio Route 122 accesses Interstate 75 running to the east of Middletown.

Middletown had multiple railroad stations serving the different railroads running through the city, Baltimore and Ohio, Erie Railroad, New York Central (earlier, the Cleveland, Cincinnati, Chicago and St. Louis Railway) and Pennsylvania Railroad. The last passenger trains were the Baltimore and Ohio's Cincinnatian and Penn Central's Cincinnati-Columbus train, both ending in 1971.

Notable people

 Todd Bell, NFL safety
 Gay Brewer, professional golfer
 James E. Campbell, 38th governor of Ohio
 Butch Carter, NBA player and coach; brother of Cris
 Cris Carter, Hall of Fame NFL player
 Dan Daub, MLB pitcher
 Brooklyn Decker, fashion model
 Shaun Foist, drummer for Breaking Benjamin
 Goodwen, rock band
 William Gross, financier for Janus Capital Group and PIMCO
 Bill Hanzlik, basketball player and coach
 J. Eugene Harding, U.S. representative
 Kayla Harrison, two-time Olympic champion in judo
 Thomas Howard, former MLB player
 Howard Jones, Hall of Fame college football player and coach
 Patrick L. Kessler, Medal of Honor recipient
 Frank Lickliter, professional golfer on the PGA Tour
 Jerry Lucas, Ohio State and NBA basketball player
 Buz Lukens, U.S. Representative
 Jalin Marshall, former NFL Player, currently CFL player
 McGuire Sisters, vocal trio
 Debra Monk, Tony and Emmy Award-winning actress
 Scott Nein, member of the Ohio Senate
 Clarence Page, columnist for the Chicago Tribune
 Susan Perkins, Miss America 1978
 Chrystee Pharris, television and film actress
 Rufus Phillips, politician and businessman
 Gordon Ray Roberts, Medal of Honor recipient
 Charlie Root, MLB pitcher
 Terry Rukavina, All-American Girls Professional Baseball League player
 Van Gordon Sauter, American Communications Executive
 Ed Schrock, U.S. representative
 Kyle Schwarber, MLB left fielder
 Shepherd Sisters,  vocal quartet
 Paul J. Sorg, U.S. representative
 Ferdinand Van Derveer, brigadier general in the Civil War
 Roy Lucas, American football coach
 J. D. Vance, lawyer, venture capitalist, political candidate, author of Hillbilly Elegy, United States Senator for Ohio
 William Verity, Jr., 27th secretary of commerce between 1987 and 1989
 John M. Watson, Sr., trombonist and actor
 Virtue Hampton Whitted, jazz singer and bassist

Pop culture references
J. D. Vance describes his life in Middletown in Hillbilly Elegy: A Memoir of a Family and Culture in Crisis (2016). His family had moved there from Jackson, Kentucky and became caught in the problems of industrial restructuring and loss of jobs.

Bristol Palin wrote negatively about a 2008 visit to Middletown in her autobiography Not Afraid of Life: My Journey So Far (2017).

Kimmy Schmidt from the eponymous Netflix show falsely claims she is from Middletown, Ohio, in Season 1, Episode 3. Xanthippe looks it up on her phone, expecting Kimmy has made the place up, but is irritated to find that such a place exists.

Middletown, Ohio is the home town of James Donovan Halliday, the creator of the OASIS in Ready Player One.

See also

 South Middletown, Ohio

References

Further reading
 Bert S. Barlow, W.H. Todhunter, Stephen D. Cone, Joseph J. Pater, and Frederick Schneider, eds. Centennial History of Butler County, Ohio. Hamilton, Ohio: B.F. Bowen, 1905.
 Jim Blount. The 1900s: 100 Years In the History of Butler County, Ohio. Hamilton, Ohio: Past Present Press, 2000.
 Butler County Engineer's Office. Butler County Official Transportation Map, 2003. Fairfield Township, Butler County, Ohio: The Office, 2003.
 A History and Biographical Cyclopaedia of Butler County, Ohio with Illustrations and Sketches of Its Representative Men and Pioneers. Cincinnati, Ohio: Western Biographical Publishing Company, 1882. 
 Ohio. Secretary of State. The Ohio municipal and township roster, 2002-2003. Columbus, Ohio: The Secretary, 2003.

External links
 City of Middletown
 Middletown Chamber of Commerce
 Middletown Historical Society
 Middletown Journal
 Middletown City Schools
 Middletown Library
 Middletown News
 Middletown Lyric Theatre
 
 "In Depth: America's Fastest-Dying Towns: 10. Middletown, Ohio"

 
Cities in Ohio
Cities in Butler County, Ohio
Cities in Warren County, Ohio
1833 establishments in Ohio
Populated places established in 1833